Yegor Viktorovich Yevdokimov (born 9 March 1982) is a Russian handball player for HC Spartak and the Russian national team.

References

1982 births
Living people
Russian male handball players
Sportspeople from Chelyabinsk
Olympic handball players of Russia
Handball players at the 2008 Summer Olympics
HC Motor Zaporizhia players
Expatriate handball players
Russian expatriate sportspeople in Belarus
Russian expatriate sportspeople in Spain
Russian expatriate sportspeople in Ukraine